Charleston Southern University (CSU) is a private Baptist university in North Charleston, South Carolina. It is affiliated with the South Carolina Baptist Convention (Southern Baptist Convention).

History
Charleston Southern University was chartered in 1960 and became the Baptist College of Charleston, where it offered its first classes in the education building of the First Baptist Church of North Charleston.

The university offered the first instruction at a post secondary level in 1965 and awarded its first degree in 1967. In 1990, the South Carolina Baptist Convention voted to change the university's name from Baptist College at Charleston to Charleston Southern University.

Academics
The university is accredited by the Commission on Colleges of the Southern Association of Colleges and Schools to award bachelor's and master's degrees. CSU students can choose from more than 50 undergraduate majors and graduate programs such as business, education, criminal justice, computer science, cyber security, Christian studies, graphic design, nursing, physical therapy, physician assistant, etc. Each degree program is combined with a comprehensive liberal arts foundation which is designed to develop problem-solving and communication skills.

Accreditation 
Charleston Southern University is accredited by the Southern Association of Colleges and Schools (SACSCOC) to award baccalaureate, master’s, and doctorate degrees.
It is affiliated with the South Carolina Baptist Convention (Southern Baptist Convention).

Campus

Charleston Southern is located off Exit 205B on I-26 in North Charleston, South Carolina.

Student activities
Beyond the classroom, students can participate in a variety of campus activities including academic clubs, service organizations, intramural athletics and campus ministries. Intramural athletic activities include flag football, basketball, volleyball, ultimate frisbee, and more. Campus ministries include Cru, Fellowship of Christian Athletes, Campus Outreach, and Elevate.

Student life
Single students under 21 years of age are encouraged to live on campus. There are at least four dining facilities on campus; one is the dining hall located in the Student Center, another is Java City located near the library, Chick-fil-A and, the newest addition, The Buc Stop in the Student Center.

Athletics

The university offers intercollegiate athletics for both men and women, competing in the NCAA Division I Big South Conference. Charleston Southern fields teams in the following sports:

Notable alumni
Charles James – Professional football player and star of HBO's Hard Knocks
Dr. Sam Gandy – Alzheimer's researcher
Bobby Parnell – Professional baseball player
Tim Scott – United States Senator
Charlie Simpkins – Track and field athlete; 1992 Olympic Games silver medalist in the triple jump
R. J. Swindle – Professional baseball player
Tyler Thornburg – Professional baseball player
Michelle D. Commander – Associate Director and Curator of the Lapidus Center at the Schomburg Center for Research in Black Culture.

References

External links

 
1964 establishments in South Carolina
Buildings and structures in North Charleston, South Carolina
Council for Christian Colleges and Universities
Education in Charleston County, South Carolina
Education in North Charleston, South Carolina
Educational institutions established in 1964
Universities and colleges accredited by the Southern Association of Colleges and Schools
Universities and colleges affiliated with the Southern Baptist Convention
Private universities and colleges in South Carolina